IEEE 802.7 is a sub-standard of the IEEE 802 which covers broadband local area networks. The working group did issue a recommendation in 1989, but is currently inactive and in hibernation.

IEEE 802.07
Working groups